Gary Simmons (born July 25, 1971) is an American politician and retired military law enforcement officer. He is a member of the Maryland House of Delegates for District 12B in Anne Arundel County, Maryland.

Background
Simmons graduated from Walter G. O'Connell Copiague High School in 1990, and later attended Tuskegee University, where he earned a Bachelor of Science degree in criminal justice and political science in 1994. Before becoming a state delegate, Simmons is a sergeant field training officer at Luminis Health, Inc.

In 2022, Simmons ran for the Maryland House of Delegates in District 31 (later drawn into the newly created District 12B), seeking to succeed outgoing state delegate Ned Carey. He won the Democratic primary on July 19, 2022, and defeated Republican challenger Ashley Arias in the general election on November 8.

In the legislature
Simmons was sworn into the Maryland House of Delegates on January 11, 2023, with the start of the Maryland General Assembly's 445th legislative session. He is a member of the House Judiciary Committee.

Electoral history

References

External links
 

21st-century African-American politicians
21st-century American politicians
African-American state legislators in Maryland
Democratic Party members of the Maryland House of Delegates
Living people
People from Savannah, Georgia
Tuskegee University alumni
1971 births